Starshot Glacier is a glacier 50 nautical miles (90 km) long, flowing from the polar plateau eastward through the Churchill Mountains, then north along the west side of Surveyors Range, entering the Ross Ice Shelf south of Cape Parr. So named by the New Zealand Geological Survey Antarctic Expedition (NZGSAE) (1960–61) because the area was surveyed with the use of star observations.

Glaciers of the Ross Dependency
Shackleton Coast